Jens Kristian Meinich Bratlie (17 January 1856 – 15 September 1939) was a Norwegian attorney and military officer. He served as an elected official representing the Conservative Party. He was the 13th prime minister of Norway from 1912 to 1913.

Biography
Jens Bratlie was born at Nordre Land in Oppland, Norway.   Bratlie came from a family of leading businessmen and civil servant. He was the son of  Erik Bratlie (1814-1890) and wife Bolette Sofie Meinich (1821-1870). Following the death of his mother, he was adopted by the industrialist Jørgen Meinich.

Bratlie graduated from the Military High School in 1880 and was trained as an army officer (eventually rising to the level of Major General). He  also earned a law degree allowing him to work as a high-ranking civil servant (1886). He served several years as expedition secretary in the Department of Defense. He became Captain (1893), General Commission Commissioner (1898) and General Attorney for the Armenian Judiciary from  1906.

Bratlie held several offices such as leader of the Conservative Party (1910–11) and president of the Storting (1910–12). He was in the Storting representing Kristiania (now Oslo) 1900-12 and 1916–18. He served as Norwegian  Minister of Defence and Minister of Auditing from 1912 to 1913.

In the 1927 Norwegian parliamentary election he was the fourth ballot candidate for the party National Legion, behind Karl Meyer, Frøis Frøisland and Thorvald Aadahl. In a press release, the National Legion (led by Meyer) stated that it had cherry picked "strong" personalities to combat the hardships in Norwegian politics. Frøisland denounced the ballot in an Aftenposten piece, stating that himself, Aadahl and Bratlie was unwilling and unaware of the nomination. He stated that a vote for the National Legion would be a wasted vote in the struggle against the "communists". However, according to Norwegian election law the people who were listed on the ballot had no legal grounds to avoid being nominated.

He served as chairman of the Conservative Party from 1911 to 1919. Following his death in 1939, his interment was at Vår Frelsers gravlund.

See also
Bratlie's Cabinet

References

1856 births
1939 deaths
People from Nordre Land
University of Oslo alumni
Fatherland League (Norway)
Norwegian Army generals
20th-century Norwegian lawyers
Presidents of the Storting
Members of the Storting
Prime Ministers of Norway
Leaders of the Conservative Party (Norway)
20th-century Norwegian politicians
Burials at the Cemetery of Our Saviour
Defence ministers of Norway